Marie-Paule Serve (née Charles, born 16 October 1941) was a New Caledonian politician. She was one of two women elected to the Territorial Assembly of New Caledonia in 1977, the territory's first female legislators.

Biography
Serve was born in Haiphong in French Indochina in 1941 and was educated at the Faculté Libre de Droit in Toulon. She married Yvau Sevre, with whom she had a daughter. Having moved to New Caledonia, she became president of the Fédération Feminine Calédonienne.

She also became involved in politics and was a Rally for Caledonia candidate in the 1977 elections. Alongside Edwige Antier, she became one of the first two women in the Territorial Assembly. She was re-elected in 1979, serving until the 1984 elections.

References

1941 births
Living people
New Caledonian women in politics
Members of the Congress of New Caledonia
The Rally (New Caledonia) politicians